Reunion is a live album released on April 1, 1996 by the Washington, D.C.-based go-go band Junk Yard Band. The album was recorded live in December 1995 at the Martin's Crosswinds Ballroom in Greenbelt, Maryland. It consists of ten tracks, including the songs "Sardines", "The Word", "Tiddy Balls", and "Hee Haw".

Track listing

"Intro"  – 1:24
"The Word"  – 3:33
"Sardines"  – 2:29
"Hee Haw" – 3:18
"Ruff-It-Off" – 5:30
"Tiddy Balls" – 3:11
"Here Come the Freaks" – 3:56
"Uh Oh" – 2:27
"Exit Theme" – 0:55
"Good Night, Good Morning – 3:46

References

External links
Reunion at ARTISTdirect
Reunion at Last.fm

1996 live albums
Junk Yard Band albums